Narrabeen was a paddle steamer ferry on Sydney Harbour that ran on the Circular Quay to Manly route.

Name
She was named after the Sydney suburb of Narrabeen, one of the first ferries to be named after localities on Sydney's northern beaches. This would become a naming tradition for Manly ferries that continued through to contemporary ferries.

She was the first of three Manly ferries to be named Narrabeen. The last Manly cargo vessel, Narrabeen (II), was built in 1921, sold in 1928 to the Westernport Bay Shipping Company and wrecked in 1958. Narrabeen (III) was commissioned in 1984 as the third of four Freshwater-class ferries, the four of which remain in service.

Design and construction
She was built in 1886 by Mort's Dock and Engineering for the Port Jackson Steamship Company.

Service history
Originally built with an open wheelhouse, it was later glassed in to offer more protection to the master and helmsman. Smaller and of lower passenger capacity than her contemporary  (1883), she was used on off-peak services to Manly. With the introduction of the larger Bingarra class, she was modified in 1911 for use as a cargo ferry with derricks fitted at either end. She was hulked about 1917 and her fate after this is unknown.

See also
 List of Sydney Harbour ferries

References

External links
 

Ferries of New South Wales
Ferry transport in Sydney
1886 ships
Sydney Harbour
Water transport in New South Wales
Ships of Australia